Vasundhara is a 2014 Kannada thriller/drama film directed by T.S. Nagabharana. The name refers to Mother Earth and its role as life giver, protector, preserver and absolver of all sins of all forms of life, and the embodiment of patience and tolerance.

Synopsis
The film revolves around the trials and tribulations of Vasundhara AKA as Mrs. Bagatov who is inadvertently caught in the cauldron of terrorist violence, communal frenzy, corporate greediness, corrupt bureaucracy and media manipulations. In the process it also unravels the positive power of the media, the uncompromising commitment to distinguish between right and wrong in the face of great suffering and the need for empowerment of women in the interest of the future of our society.

Cast

Rajesh
Aishwarya Nag as Vasundhara 
Avinash Jugari
Jayanthi
T. S. Nagabharana
Ashok Rao
Sudharani
Dharma as Afroz Pasha
Rajshri Ponnappa
Bharath Kalyan as Arun Chawla
Pannaga Bharana
Nagini Bharana
Shrutha Bharana
M.K. Uppinangadi
Suryodhaya
Sriphathi Manjanbail
Girish Jatti
Niranjan
Ramesh Babu
Harish Ninasam
Baby Saanavi Bharana

Production

Story, Screenplay & Direction – T.S. Nagabharana
Lyrics – Gopal Vajapeyee, Lakshmpathi Kolar & Vasuki Vaibhav
Producers – R. Nanjappa & Naginibharana
Script & Dialogue – Lakshmpathi Kolar
Music Director – Stephan Prayog
Cinematography – Ananth Urs
Choreography – Madhan Harini
Background Music - L.Kumara
Editing – Ravi Aradhya
Art - Appaiah B Vittal
Costume – Nagini Bharana
Associate Director – Pannaga Bharana & M.K. Uppinangadi
Makeup – Kumar Nonavinkere
Script Assistant – Chethan Hoskote
Research Advisors – Pro.Chandrashekar Ushala 
Assistant Directors – Bhaskar Rao M, Vijendra B N, Vikas Chandra & Sriphathi Manjanbail & Vidyananda Desai
PRO – Sudhindra Venkatesh
Production Manager – N.S. Chandrashekar & RTO Devaraj
Production House – Shruthalaya Films.

The production commenced on 23 May 2013 and was wrapped up on 10 July 2013

Soundtrack 

The film's soundtrack is composed by Stephen Prayog. The lyrics were penned by Gopal Vajapeyee, Lakshmpathi Kolar, and Vasuki Vaibhav. The soundtrack was launched on 9 January 2014. It is being distributed by Ashwini Audio. The entire soundtrack album can be purchased from Hungama Digital Media Entertainment

Marketing
The online marketing campaign of the movie has been taken up by Adwitiya Technologies. The first official teaser of the movie was released on 13 December 2013. The second official teaser was released on 29 December 2013. The music videos of the songs "Kanasella Neene (Are Are)" and "Gana Nayaka" were released on 4 January 2014 and 13 January 2014 respectively.

The soundtrack was released on 9 January 2014. All the songs were made available online through a YouTube Jukebox on 21 January 2014.

Release

References

2014 films
Indian thriller films
2010s Kannada-language films
2014 thriller films
Films directed by T. S. Nagabharana